Simulation is a monthly peer-reviewed scientific journal that covers the field of computer Science. The editor-in-chief is Gabriel Wainer (Carleton University). The journal was established in 1963 and is published by SAGE Publications in association with the Society for Modeling and Simulation International.

Abstracting and indexing
The journal is abstracted and indexed in Scopus and the Science Citation Index Expanded.

External links
 

SAGE Publishing academic journals
English-language journals
Computer science journals
Publications established in 1963
Monthly journals